Christian Chevalier (born 18 December 1966) is a French gymnast. He competed in eight events at the 1988 Summer Olympics.

References

1966 births
Living people
French male artistic gymnasts
Olympic gymnasts of France
Gymnasts at the 1988 Summer Olympics
People from Orthez
20th-century French people